Buried Treasure is a 1921 American silent adventure film directed by George D. Baker and written by George D. Baker and F. Britten Austin. The film stars Marion Davies, Norman Kerry, Anders Randolf, Edith Shayne, Earl Schenck, John Charles, and Thomas Findley. The film was released on April 10, 1921, by Paramount Pictures.

Plot
Strung around the idea of reincarnation, this film goes back in time to the days of the Spanish galleons and pirates burying their treasure; treasure to be found centuries later.

Cast 
Marion Davies as Pauline Vandermuellen / Lucia / others
Norman Kerry as Dr. John Grant
Anders Randolf as William Vandermuellen
Edith Shayne as Mrs. Vandermuellen
Earl Schenck as Joeffrey Vandermuellen
John Charles as Duc de Chavannes
Thomas Findley as The Captain

Production 
In her 10th film, Marion Davies plays a young woman whose trances lead her to a pirate's treasure. The theme of reincarnation was rare for the time. This was the first film in which Davies played a dual role: She plays the modern-day Pauline as well as the Spanish Lucia. This was also the first Davies production to be filmed on the West Coast, with several scenes filmed on Catalina. The prologue to the film shows Davies as a cavewoman, an Egyptian princess, a medieval damsel, and as Lucia.

Status
A nitrate print of Buried Treasure held in the Library of Congress is missing a reel. A limited edition DVD was released by Edward Lorusso with a music score by Lorusso and David Drazin in October 2017.

References

External links

1921 films
American adventure films
1921 adventure films
Paramount Pictures films
Films directed by George D. Baker
American black-and-white films
American silent feature films
1920s English-language films
1920s American films
Silent adventure films
English-language adventure films